National Black Graduate Student Association (NBGSA) is a non-profit interdisciplinary organization for graduate students of African descent in the United States. The national headquarters is located at Howard University in Washington, D.C. The association was established to address the needs and concerns of black graduate and professional students, and to encourage black undergraduates to pursue advanced degrees. NBGSA provides resources for ensuring the academic success of African American students and aids in developing networks of emerging black scholars, with the goal of diversifying academia and enriching the larger community.

NBGSA is managed by its members. NBGSA offers its members leadership training, professional development, mentoring opportunities, and career placement services. NBGSA is recognized as the primary student organization addressing the needs of black graduate students.

History

Founding
In May 1989, Robert M. Sellers, Todd C. Shaw, Robert Brown, Daria Kirby, Lisa Brown, and Thomas LaVeist—graduate students at the University of Michigan—planned and hosted the National Black Graduate Student Conference (NBGSC) to "address some of the issues that the African American community faced." Sellers, who chaired the planning committee, stated that the NBGSC was designed to "provide an opportunity for African American graduate students to develop professionally as well as serve as a forum for future researchers and professionals." At the first NBGSC black graduate students from across the United States participated in paper presentations, professional workshops, and round-table discussions related to the professional development of African American students and the black community. The conference had attendees from over 25 universities, including the University of Kentucky, Howard University, Northern Illinois University, Case Western Reserve University, and Texas A&M University.

With help from the Office of Minority Affairs at the University of Michigan, the conference planning committee hosted a successful three-day event. James S. Jackson, Associate Dean and Professor of Psychology at the University of Michigan, credited the black graduate students with contributing to the university’s commitment to the "value of diversity in intellectual inquiry and teaching." Jackson stated that the "overwhelming response and involvement of graduate students across the country is a testament to the need and importance of this meeting." As result of the NBGSC, the conference attendees decided to create a national organization that would address issues concerning black graduates. The NBGSA was proposed at the end of the national conference in 1989. 

The association's pro tempore national president was Todd C. Shaw, a doctoral student at the University of Michigan. His executive board consisted of Jacqueline M. Davis, graduate student at Mississippi State University as Vice-President; Donna Cochran, graduate student at the University of Michigan as Recording Secretary; Barbara Gates, doctoral candidate at the University of Michigan as Corresponding Secretary; and Minora Sharpe, graduate student at Pennsylvania State University as Treasurer. With Shaw as president, the initial constitution to establish the association was written.

The second annual conference was held at Mississippi State University in 1990. On the final day of the conference, the official constitution of the NBGSA was voted upon and adopted by conference attendees. New officers were elected to formally establish the association. Phyllis Gray-Ray, Associate Professor of Sociology, Anthropology, and Social Work at Mississippi State University, served as the first National Advisory Chair and became the first Executive Director of NBGSA. Mississippi State University became NBGSA's home in 1994, and the association remained in that location until 1997.

Early years
NBGSA in its early years followed the career of Gray-Ray. In 1997, she accepted a position at North Carolina Central University in Durham, North Carolina. The Executive Council agreed to temporarily move the national headquarters to North Carolina. Several years later, Gray-Ray took another position at Jackson State University, and the association relocated its national office back to Mississippi. Upon arriving at Jackson State University, Gray-Ray resigned from her position with NBGSA. The Executive Council presented Gray-Ray with the title of Executive Director Emeritus in 2000 at the national conference held at the University of Wisconsin–Madison. In 1999, NBGSA moved to Howard University's Graduate School in Washington, D.C., where it remains headquartered.

Presidents

 1989–1990: Todd C. Shaw, Ph.D., University of Michigan
 1990–1991: Jacqueline M. Davis-Gines, Ph.D., Mississippi State University
 1991–1992: James Alexander Robinson, Ph.D., University of California, Berkeley
 1992–1993: Thomas Stewart, Ph.D., Howard University
 1993–1994: Marwin Spiller, Ph.D., University of Illinois at Urbana–Champaign
 1994–1995: Sharron Y. Herron, Ph.D., Mississippi State University
 1995–1996: Kevin McPherson, Ph.D., University of Oklahoma
 1996–1997: Shannon Marquez, Ph.D., University of North Carolina at Chapel Hill
 1997–1998: Kevin Michael Foster, Ph.D., University of Texas at Austin
 1998–1999: Charmaine N. Jackson Mercer, Ph.D., Claremont Graduate University
 1999–2000: Kimberly R. Moffitt, Ph.D., Howard University
 2000–2001: Tessa Johnson, MA, Northern Illinois University
 2001–2002: Adrienne D. Dixson, Ph.D., University of Wisconsin–Madison
 2002–2004: Tamara Bertrand Jones, Ph.D., Florida State University
 2004–2005: Marla J. Mitchell, M.Ed., Miami University (Ohio)
 2005–2006: Kaye Thompson-Rogers, Ph.D., Jackson State University
 2006–2007: Ivan B. Turnispeed, Ph.D., University of Nevada, Las Vegas
 2007–2009: Nameka R. Bates, MS, University of Illinois at Urbana–Champaign
 2009–2010: Tina L. Ligon, MA, MLS, University of Maryland, College Park
 2010–2011: Antonio White, MA, Morgan State University
 2011–2012: Lauren Williams, MPA, Clark Atlanta University
 2012–2014: Anta Sane, MBA, MSL, Howard University
 2014–present: John Nwosu, M.Ed, Georgia Southern University

Conferences

National 

 1989: Social Science Research on Black America, University of Michigan
 1990: Global Perspective on Black Cultures, Mississippi State University
 1991: Research and Service: Black Intellectual Activism on the Horizon of the Twenty First Century, University of California, Berkeley
 1992: The Research Problem: Black Scholarly Activism on the Horizon of the 21st Century, Howard University
 1993: Cultivating a Vision: The Black Community in the Midst of Global Change, University of Minnesota 
 1994: Promoting the African Diaspora through Education, Mississippi State University
 1995: From Many, One: People of the African Diaspora, University of Florida 
 1996: Bridging the Gap between Academia and the African Community, Claremont Graduate University
 1997: Making our Future by the Best Use of Our Present, Alliance of Black Graduate and Professional Students of the University of North Carolina, Chapel Hill in collaboration with the North Carolina Triangle Area Black Graduate Student Alliance
 1998: The Future of Diversity in Higher Education, University of Texas at Austin
 1999: Expanding Our Ranks: Black Scholars in the New Millennium, Louisiana State University
 2000: Facing the Challenge: Black Leadership 2000 and Beyond, University of Wisconsin–Madison
 2001: Building the Vision Black Scholars in the World of Education and Beyond, Texas Tech University
 2002: Black Scholars: Connecting Community and Scholarship, Howard University
 2003: Celebrating 15 Years of the NBGSC: Making a Difference in the Community through Leadership, Scholarship and Service, Atlanta, Georgia
 2004: Higher Education in Changing Times, University of Cincinnati
 2005: Mission Possible: Taking Back the Black Community, Charlotte, North Carolina
 2006: Positively 'Facing the Rising Sun', Las Vegas, Nevada
 2007: Heirs of the Dream: Building on a Tradition of Intellectual Excellence, Baltimore, Maryland
 2008: Brilliance in Black, Chicago, Illinois
 2009: Empowered. Engaged. Expect It!, Houston, Texas
 2010: Pioneering the Change Within, San Diego, California
 2011: Transforming Roads Ahead, Columbia, South Carolina
 2012: Claiming Your Place in Uncommon Spaces, Valley Forge, Pennsylvania
 2013: Honoring The Past, Defining The Future, Dearborn, Michigan

Regional 

 2004: Mobilizing the West: Achieving Success and Making a Difference!, University of Nevada, Las Vegas
 2006: Continuing the Dream of Intellectual Excellence, Norfolk State University
 2006: Putting the Dream Together, Howard University
 2006: Birthrights and Blueprints: Black Intellectualism in the American West, University of California, Los Angeles
 2006: Growing with NBGSA, University of Illinois at Urbana-Champaign
 2007: Fulfilling the Legacy of Black Achievements, University of Maryland College Park

 2007: Revitalizing the Black Intellectual Movement, Durham, North Carolina
 2007: Establishing the Vision for the Future, Purdue University2007: Reflection of Black Renaissance: Continuing their Legacy, Fuller Theological Seminary
 2008: Yes We Can: Decreasing the Disparity of Blacks in Academia, Minnesota State University, Mankato
 2008: His Dream, His Legacy, Our Destiny, University of Arizona
 2008: The Fierce Urgency of Now: Black Scholars in a Rapidly Changing World, Bloomsburg University of Pennsylvania2009: B.R.I.D.G.E. Building Relationships by Instilling Diversity in Graduate Education, Jackson State University
 2009: A Community of Scholars: Re-Establishing Purpose Remembering our Identities, Re-Stating our Commitments, University of Illinois at Urbana-Champaign
 2009: Still We Rise: Only through Sharing History can You Empower Yourself, Arizona State University
 2009: The Power of Definition: Navigating from Invisible Places to Visible Spaces, Morgan State University
 2009: Metamorphosis: Changing Yourself by Changing Your Motives, University of South Carolina
 2010: Finding the Perfect Fit: Keys to Unlocking Self-Potential, Mississippi State University
 2010: Empowering and Integrating Black Scholars: Looking Back, Reaching Out, Moving Forward in Institutions of Higher Learning, University of Oregon
 2010: Engagement, Consciousness and Pride: Leadership in the Pan African Community, University of Cincinnati

External links 

 Official site

References

Student organizations in the United States
African-American organizations